Jeron may refer to:

Jeron Al-Hazaimeh (born 1992), German professional footballer
Cassian Jeron Andor, a fictional character in the Star Wars franchise
Jeron Harvey (born 1984), arena football wide receiver
Jeron Johnson (born 1988), American footballer and coach
Jeron Mastrud (born 1987), American footballer
Jeron Roberts (born 1976), American-Israeli professional basketball player
Jeron Robinson (born 1991), American track and field high jumper
Jeron Slusher (born 1944), Guatemalan footballer
Jeron Teng (born 1994), Filipino professional basketball player
Jeron Wilson (born 1977), American regular-footed professional skateboarder

See also
Jeron Khalsa, town and a gram panchayat in Niwari district, Madhya Pradesh, India